Jan Hansen may refer to:

 Jan Hansen (curler) (born 1957), Danish curler
 Jan Hansen (footballer) (born 1955), Norwegian footballer
 Jan Hansen (rower) (born 1970), Danish lightweight rower
 Jan Vang Sørensen (née Hansen, born c. 1960), retired Danish football player turned professional poker player